John Marshall FRS FRCS (11 September 1818 – 1 January 1891) was an English surgeon and teacher of anatomy.

Early life and education

John Marshall was born in Ely, Cambridgeshire. He was the second son and third child of the solicitor William Marshall (1776–1842) and Ann Cropley ( 1793–1861), his second wife. Marshall entered University College, London, in 1838.

Career
In 1847 Marshall was appointed assistant-surgeon at University College hospital, becoming in 1866 surgeon and professor of surgery. He was professor of anatomy at the Royal Academy from 1873 until his death. In 1883 he was president of the College of Surgeons, also Bradshaw lecturer (on "Nerve-stretching for the relief or cure of pain"), Hunterian orator in 1885, and Morton lecturer in 1889.

Regarding Marshall's skills as a teacher and lecturer, the opinions of his former students appear to have diverged. One of them, Sir Edward Albert Sharpey-Schafer, described him as "a good surgeon of the old school" and as "a good friend" for whom he had "great respect and liking" but also as an "uninspiring teacher" whose lectures were "desperately dull". However, another former student, Sir John Tweedy, strongly disagreed with Schafer and described Marshall's lectures as "informative and thought-awakening" and Marshall himself as "a cultured, critical and scientific surgeon, ever ready to try new paths and explore avenues of fresh knowledge".

Sir William MacCormac wrote in his volume on the Centenary of the College of Surgeons (1900):

Publications
The Outlines of Physiology (1867)

References

Further reading

External links
 

1818 births
1891 deaths
19th-century British biologists
Alumni of University College London
English anatomists
English Anglicans
English surgeons
Fellows of the Royal College of Surgeons
Fellows of the Royal Society
Fullerian Professors of Physiology
People from Ely, Cambridgeshire